Ronald John Petts (10 January 1914 – 26 August 1991) was a British artist. Petts was born in London, but is considered a Welsh artist and is known for his engravings and stained glass works.

Biography

 
Petts was born in the Hornsey area of north London but, despite a childhood illness limiting his education, an interest in art and Saturday morning lessons at the Hornsey School of Art led to him becoming a full-time student there in 1930. A British Institution scholarship allowed Petts to study at the Royal Academy Schools for two years from 1933, during which time he also took evening classes in printing at the Central School of Arts and Crafts.

In 1935 Petts married the artist Brenda Chamberlain in London and the couple set up home near Llanllechid in north Wales, where they held two joint exhibitions of their art and supported themselves by creating and selling greeting cards and doing some part-time teaching in Bangor. With Chamberlain, Petts bought a hand operated printing press and set up the Caseg Press in 1937 to produce bookplates, greeting cards and prints of local scenes. Petts collaborated with the poet Alun Lewis on illustrations for a number of Welsh-language magazines before the latter died in the Second World War. At the start of the war Petts had registered as a conscientious objector and was required to undertake farm work away from Wales. Petts and Chamberlain separated in 1943 after which Petts volunteered to join a Royal Army Medical Corps Parachute Field Ambulance unit. He served in Europe and the Middle East during 1944 before transferring to the Royal Army Educational Corps. He taught art at an army college in Palestine before working as an army publications editor in Cairo.

Returning to Wales Petts, and his second wife Kusha Petts, sought to restart the Caseg Press and also undertook work for the Golden Cockerel Press. He helped to design the Lloyd George Museum at Llanystumdwy which for a time housed the Caseg Press's printing press. Although new equipment allowed the Press to produce a wider range of material than previously the Press ceased production in 1951 and Petts took a series of posts with the Welsh Committee of the Arts Council. Petts was elected to the Society of Wood Engravers in 1953 and became an Associate of the Royal Society of Painter-Etchers & Engravers in 1957. Taking a post as a lecturer in design and crafts at the Carmarthen School of Art in 1957 allowed him to concentrate on working in stained-glass.

In 1963, Petts designed and created a stained glass window featuring a Black Jesus for the 16th Street Baptist Church in Birmingham, Alabama, following a racially motivated bombing that killed four African-American girls aged 11–14. Petts was said to be horrified "as a father and as a craftsman" upon hearing the news. Working with the Western Mail to raise funds, Petts arranged donations from many thousands of Welsh people to pay for the window. The window was installed and dedicated in 1965. In 1970, the designs for the window were donated to the National Library of Wales in Aberystwyth. In 2013, to mark the fiftieth anniversary of the bombing, Petts's original designs were displayed at the National Library of Wales. In September 2018, it was reported that the church was concerned that Alabama's stormy weather would destroy the window and appealled to the public to raise funds to preserve it.

Petts also created stained glass windows at the Brighton and Hove Reform Synagogue in southern England and for several churches and chapels in Wales including the Tree of Life window for St Peter's Church, Carmarthen.

Petts was a member of the Arts Council of Great Britain between 1958 and 1961. In 1966 he was awarded a Churchill Fellowship. In later life Petts lived and worked in Abergavenny.

Further reading
John Petts and the Caseg Press by Alison Smith

References

Behind the Stained Glass: A History of Sixteenth Street Baptist Church, The Rev. Dr. Christopher M. Hamlin, 1998, Crane Hill Publishers, Birmingham, Alabama.

External links

1914 births
1991 deaths
20th-century Welsh artists
Alumni of Middlesex University
Alumni of the Central School of Art and Design
Alumni of the Royal Academy Schools
Artists from London
Welsh conscientious objectors
British illustrators
British stained glass artists and manufacturers
English wood engravers
Members of The Welsh Group
People from Hornsey
Royal Army Educational Corps soldiers
Royal Army Medical Corps soldiers
British Army personnel of World War II
English conscientious objectors
20th-century engravers